Åsa-Nisse is a 1949 Swedish comedy film directed by Ragnar Frisk and starring John Elfström, Artur Rolén and Emy Hagman. Featuring the popular character Åsa-Nisse it was the first in a long-running series, featuring nineteen sequels. It takes place in rural Småland. Location shooting took place at Skirö outside Vetlanda. The film's sets were designed by the art director Bertil Duroj.

Cast
 John Elfström as Åsa-Nisse
 Artur Rolén as 	Klabbarparn
 Emy Hagman as 	Elsa Haglund
 Bertil Boo as 	Eric Broo
 Greta Berthels as 	Eulalia
 Gustaf Lövås as 	Sjökvist
 Gösta Gustafson as Knohultarn
 Josua Bengtson as 	Jönson
 Astrid Bodin as 	Woman from the next parish
 Helga Brofeldt as 	Woman from the next parish
 Mona Geijer-Falkner as 	Woman from the next parish
 Einar Lidholm as 	Police Chief
 Stig Johanson as 	Olsson
 Gösta Ericsson as 	Crook
 Verner Oakland as 	Crook

References

Bibliography 
 Iverson, Gunnar, Soderbergh Widding, Astrid & Soila, Tytti. Nordic National Cinemas. Routledge, 2005.
 Sundholm, John . Historical Dictionary of Scandinavian Cinema. Scarecrow Press, 2012.

External links 
 

1949 films
Swedish comedy films
1949 comedy films
1940s Swedish-language films
Films directed by Ragnar Frisk
Swedish black-and-white films
1940s Swedish films